Manus Boonjumnong (born June 23, 1980) is a Thai boxer who won the Olympics at Light Welterweight (60–64 kg) at the 2004 Summer Olympics. He is the older brother of Non Boonjumnong.

Amateur career
At the 2003 World Amateur Boxing Championships in his home town Bangkok, the light-footed counterpuncher won the bronze medal losing to Russian Alexander Maletin.

In 2006, he made a successful comeback when he was crowned Asian champion. He narrowly defeated reigning 2005 world champion Serik Sapiyev at the tournament although he was knocked down.

In Chicago at the 2007 World Amateur Boxing Championships, he was upset early against Japanese Masatsugu Kawachi.

Olympics 2004
Boonjumnong qualified for the Athens Games by ending up in first place at the 1st AIBA Asian 2004 Olympic Qualifying Tournament in Guangzhou, PR China. In the final he defeated Kazakhstan's Nurzhan Karimzhanov. In Athens he beat reigning world champion Willy Blain and the Cuban Yudel Johnson in the final and won gold.
2004 Olympic Results
Defeated Spyridon Ioannidis (Greece) 28:16
Defeated Romeo Brin (Philippines) 29:15
Defeated Willy Blain (France) 20:8
Defeated Ionut Gheorghe (Romania) 30:9
Defeated Yudel Johnson (Cuba) 17:11

Olympics 2008
Defeated Masatsugu Kawachi (Japan) 8:1
Defeated Serik Sapiyev (Kazakhstan) 7:5
Defeated Roniel Iglesias Sotolongo (Cuba) 10:5
Lost to Manuel Félix Díaz (Dominican Rep.) 12:4

Professional boxing record

External links

profile

References

1980 births
Living people
Light-welterweight boxers
Boxers at the 2004 Summer Olympics
Boxers at the 2008 Summer Olympics
Manus Boonjumnong
Manus Boonjumnong
Manus Boonjumnong
Place of birth missing (living people)
Olympic medalists in boxing
Asian Games medalists in boxing
Manus Boonjumnong
Boxers at the 2002 Asian Games
Boxers at the 2006 Asian Games
Medalists at the 2008 Summer Olympics
Manus Boonjumnong
AIBA World Boxing Championships medalists
Medalists at the 2004 Summer Olympics
Manus Boonjumnong
Medalists at the 2006 Asian Games
Southeast Asian Games medalists in boxing
Manus Boonjumnong
Competitors at the 2007 Southeast Asian Games